The Qatar national rugby union team represents Qatar in men's international rugby union. The team plays in the West Asia division of the Asia Rugby Championship. The Qatar Rugby Federation is a full member of Asia Rugby and an associate member of World Rugby.

History 
Prior to 2011, the Qataris had some involvement with the Arabian Gulf rugby union team. 

The Qatar national team made its debut in the 2011 Asian Five Nations fourth division. The team, with a blend of veteran international players qualifying under IRB residency regulations and young local players, beat both Jordan and Lebanon to claim the divisional title.

Record

Overall

2016 

The Qatar Rugby Federation hosted Asia Rugby Championship Division III at the Aspire warm up and purpose built rugby pitch on the 16, 19 and 22 of April.

2018 

Qatar will be competing in the upcoming Asia Rugby Championship in 2018 taking place in Lebanon. The tournament will take place at the Fouad Chehab Stadium, starting on 24 April. Both Iran and Lebanon will also be competing.

Squad

HSBC Asian 5 Nations (Division III) 

Qatar have recently been promoted to Division III of the HSBC Asian Five Nations. Division III is made up of four teams, China, Indonesia, Guam and Qatar.

Qatar won both of their matches in the 2013 Asian 5 Nations held in Kuala Lumpur, securing a promotion to Division II in next year's tournament.

Qatar first beat China 76 - 0 which put them into the final against Guam, score 13 - 7 to Qatar.

Training Ground 

The Doha Rugby Football Club / Aspire Warm-Up Track

Sponsorship 

Qatar Duty Free, are currently the sole sponsor for the Qatar Rugby Team. Helping to supply the team with kits and traveling gear.

Website 

http://www.qatarugby.com/

External links
http://www.gulf-times.com/site/topics/printArticle.asp?cu_no=2&item_no=434556&version=1&template_id=57&parent_id=56
 http://www.asian5nations.com/node/340
 http://www.asian5nations.com/node/359
 https://www.youtube.com/watch?v=j2W6ixZrjW8 (Match Video QATAR Vs Lebanon)
 Trieu chung viem da dau
 https://www.youtube.com/watch?v=C9OX6bq3stI (Match Video QATAR Vs Jordan)
 https://web.archive.org/web/20120922033137/http://www.gulf-times.com/site/topics/article.asp?cu_no=2&item_no=432926&version=1&template_id=36&parent_id=16
 Tuong phat di lac dep
Đồ Thờ Lộc Phát
Tượng Phật Quan Âm
Đồ Thờ Lộc Phát
Pháp Âm Nguyên Thủy
Tượng Thánh Tăng Sivali đẹp nhất